Rhabdotylus is a genus of horse flies in the family Tabanidae.

Species
Rhabdotylus ruber (Thunberg, 1827)
Rhabdotylus venenatum (Osten Sacken, 1886)
Rhabdotylus viridiventre (Macquart, 1838)

References

Tabanidae
Diptera of South America
Taxa named by Adolfo Lutz
Brachycera genera